Motile sperm domain containing 1 is a protein that in humans is encoded by the MOSPD1 gene.

References

Further reading